David Barlow (born 22 October 1983) is an Australian professional basketball player for Melbourne United of the National Basketball League (NBL). He has won five NBL championships.

Junior career
Born in the Melbourne suburb of Sandringham, Barlow played for the Sandringham Sabres of the Big V from 2001 to 2003. In 2002, Barlow moved to the United States to attend Metropolitan State University of Denver in Colorado. In 2002–03, he played 30 games (13 starts) for the Roadrunners, averaging 2.9 points and 1.9 rebounds per game.

Professional career

Early years in the NBL (2003–2009)
Barlow returned to Australia in 2003 and signed with the Sydney Kings of the National Basketball League (NBL). He spent four seasons with the Kings and was a member of two championship-winning teams. On 28 November 2006, he was ruled out of the rest of the 2006–07 NBL season after rupturing the anterior cruciate ligament in his right knee at training the day before. Between 2004 and 2006, Barlow also played in the Waratah League for the Sydney Comets.

In April 2007, Barlow signed with the Melbourne Tigers. He spent two seasons with the Tigers and helped the club win the 2007–08 NBL championship.

Spain (2009–2013)
In August 2009, Barlow parted ways with the Tigers and signed a one-year deal with Spanish club CAI Zaragoza. In 2009–10, he helped Zaragoza win the LEB Oro championship. In May 2010, he re-signed with CAI Zaragoza for the 2010–11 season.

In August 2011, Barlow signed a one-year deal with UCAM Murcia. In July 2012, he re-signed with Murcia on a two-year deal. In July 2013, he parted ways with Murcia.

Poland (2013–2014)
On 9 August 2013, Barlow signed a two-year deal with Polish club Stelmet Zielona Góra. On 14 January 2014, he parted ways with Stelmet.

Melbourne United (2014–present)
On 2 July 2014, Barlow signed a two-year deal with Melbourne United. In 2014–15, he averaged 9.0 points and 3.7 rebounds in 25 games. Barlow sat out the entire 2015–16 season with an achilles injury.

On 24 May 2016, Barlow re-signed with Melbourne United for the 2016–17 NBL season. He missed the team's first nine games of the season with a calf injury. Following the NBL season, he joined Obradoiro in Spain but only appeared in one game to finish the 2016–17 ACB season.

On 16 June 2017, Barlow re-signed with Melbourne United for the 2017–18 NBL season. In March 2018, he helped United win the NBL championship. During the 2018 off-season, he was initially set to play in New Zealand for the Hawke's Bay Hawks but ultimately played for the Sandringham Sabres in the SEABL.

On 7 May 2018, Barlow re-signed with United for the 2018–19 NBL season. In March 2019, Barlow set a new record for NBL Grand Final appearances with his 26th appearance. In April 2019, he re-joined the Sandringham Sabres.

On 29 April 2019, Barlow re-signed with United for the 2019–20 NBL season. After injuring his thumb in a pre-season game he missed both of United's pre-season NBLxNBA games and the first two rounds of the season, however he returned to help them recover from a poor start to the season and reach the semi-finals.

On 22 July 2020, Barlow re-signed with United for the 2020–21 NBL season. In June 2021, he helped United win the NBL championship.

On 5 July 2021, Barlow re-signed with United for the 2021–22 NBL season. Following the NBL season, he served as player-coach of the Sandringham Sabres for the 2022 NBL1 South season.

After initially announcing his retirement and joining United's coaching staff, Barlow reversed his retirement decision and re-signed with the United on 16 September 2022 for the 2022–23 NBL season.

National team career
In 2006, Barlow made his debut for the Australian national team at the 2006 FIBA World Championship in Japan. He went on to make his Olympic debut in Beijing 2008 where the Boomers finished seventh. In 2010, Barlow was part of the Boomers team to contest the World Championships in Turkey where the team placed 10th. Barlow returned to Olympic competition at the London 2012 Games. With Australia losing their opening two preliminary matches to Brazil and Spain, they went on to defeat China, hosts Great Britain and Russia to set up a quarter-final match against the USA. The Boomers went down 119–86 to the eventual gold medallists to finish seventh.

Personal life
Barlow and his wife Tiwi have one child. His wife is a native of Bali.

References

External links
 David Barlow at melbourneutd.com.au
 David Barlow at olympics.com.au
 David Barlow at foxsportspulse.com
 "David Barlow: 250 Games" at nbl.com.au

1983 births
Living people
Australian expatriate basketball people in Poland
Australian expatriate basketball people in Spain
Australian men's basketball players
Basketball players at the 2008 Summer Olympics
Basketball players at the 2012 Summer Olympics
Basketball players from Melbourne
Basket Zaragoza players
Basket Zielona Góra players
CB Murcia players
Liga ACB players
Melbourne Tigers players
Melbourne United players
Metro State Roadrunners men's basketball players
Obradoiro CAB players
Olympic basketball players of Australia
Power forwards (basketball)
Sandringham Sabres players
Small forwards
Sydney Kings players
2006 FIBA World Championship players
2010 FIBA World Championship players
People from Sandringham, Victoria